Sujjon is a village in Shaheed Bhagat Singh Nagar district of Punjab State, India. The village is administrated by Sarpanch an elected representative of the village.

Demography 
As of 2011, Sujjon has a total number of 387 houses and population of 1661 of which 805 include are males while 856 are females according to the report published by Census India in 2011. The literacy rate of Sujjon is 81.47% higher than the state average of 75.84%. The population of children under the age of 6 years is 150 which is 9.03% of total population of Sujjon, and child sex ratio is approximately 807 as compared to Punjab state average of 846.

Most of the people are from saini or Shoorsaini caste which is 80% of population. Schedule Caste which constitutes 19.63% of total population in Sujjon. The town does not have any Schedule Tribe population so far.

As per the report published by Census India in 2011, 484 people were engaged in work activities out of the total population of Sujjon which includes 400 males and 84 females. According to census survey report 2011, 84.30% workers describe their work as main work and 15.70% workers are involved in Marginal activity providing livelihood for less than 6 months.

Education 
The village has a Punjabi medium, co-ed upper primary school established in 1995. The school provide mid-day meal per Indian Midday Meal Scheme. As per Right of Children to Free and Compulsory Education Act, the school provide free education to children between the ages of 6 and 14.

Amardeep Singh Shergill Memorial college Mukandpur, KC Engineering College and Doaba Khalsa Trust Group Of Institutions are the nearest colleges.

Transport 

See also 
List of villages in India

References

External links 
 Tourism of Punjab
 Census of Punjab
 Locality Based PINCode

Villages in Shaheed Bhagat Singh Nagar district